Newport Rugby Football Club is a Welsh rugby union club based in the city of Newport, South Wales. They presently play in the Welsh Premier Division. Until 2021 Newport RFC were based at Rodney Parade situated on the east bank of the River Usk.

Every major rugby union touring team to visit Wales has played at Rodney Parade, and all of them were beaten at least once in the twentieth century by a side who, in 1951, played in the match at Cardiff RFC that attracted what was, a world-record crowd of 48,500 for a rugby union match between two clubs.

In addition to matches against all the major national sides a highlight of the Newport season was the annual match against the Barbarians, ensuring that the Newport fans enjoyed watching world-class players to supplement the Welsh internationals who were a common feature of the 'Black and Ambers'.

Newport supplied over 150 players to the Wales national team and international players to England, Scotland, Ireland, South Africa, Czech Republic, Canada and Fiji as well as over 80 Barbarians.

Following the regionalisation of Welsh rugby in 2003, Newport RFC are now a feeder club to the Dragons regional team.

In March 2017, sale of Rodney Parade to the Welsh Rugby Union was agreed following a vote of Newport RFC shareholders. The takeover was completed on 27 June 2017 and work started to install a hybrid grass pitch for the 2017–18 rugby and football season.

In October 2021 Newport RFC relocated their home matches to Newport Stadium whilst agreeing with the WRU to play two matches per season at Rodney Parade.

History

1874–1914

Newport RFC were formed in 1874 under the financial backing of the Phillips brewing family, and the playing talents of former pupils of Monmouth School, a public school which had adopted rugby union in 1873. Newport was originally intended as an association football club, but was unable to find any opponents, but they managed to organise a rugby match against Cardiff RFC, and in 1875 played Cardiff in both clubs' first-ever game.

Newport’s early success was remarkable, winning every match in their first four seasons between 1875 and 1879. They were also successful in other tournaments winning the first two South Wales Cup competitions. The club’s strength was reflected at international level, providing more players to the Welsh national team than any other club in the nineteenth century, including four captains. In 1881 Newport was one of the eleven clubs present at the forming of the Welsh Rugby Football Union, and provided six players in the first Welsh international match, more than any other club.

Partially due to their geographical location Newport also played against more established clubs from England and in 1878 a game was arranged against Manchester Athletic followed by games against Birmingham, Clifton, Gloucester and Swindon. Their dominance led Newport’s club secretary, Richard Mulloch to arrange a match against the English domestic champions Blackheath Rugby Club. With a record attendance of 5,000 spectators Newport were out-classed by their opponents, losing four goals and eight tries to nil. However, Newport had played two games in the previous five days and Blackheath brought in outside players to bolster their squad.

In October 1879 Newport played Cardiff RFC in a floodlit game at Rodney Parade; the first ground to have floodlights installed in Wales.

In 1887, Newport player Charlie Newman was given the captaincy of the Welsh national team, he was the first Newport player to achieve this honour. In 1887 Newport player Tom Clapp was given the Wales captaincy and in 1888 he led the first Welsh side to beat Scotland, a team that included Newport players Powell and Gould. During the 1891–92 season, under captain Tom Graham Newport went unbeaten, winning 29 games and drawing four. Graham brought a new professional attitude to the team, introducing weekly gym training and an avoidance of alcohol.

In 1912 Newport hosted the touring South Africa national team, and beat them 9 points to 3.

1919–1939
Invincible in 1922–23
Welsh Club Champions 1920,1923.
Provided 5 Welsh, 1 English and 1 Irish captains.
Provided 6 British Lions.
Golden era of Wetter, Uzzell, Griffiths, Morley, Bunner Travers etc.

1945–2003
Golden era of Jones, Burnett, Thomas, Meredith, Price, Watkins, Jarrett etc.
Beat Australia 1957, NZ 1963, SA 1969, Tonga 1974.
Welsh Club Champions 1951, 1956, 1962, 1969.
Won Welsh Merit Table and Anglo-Welsh Merit Table.
Provided 7 Welsh, 1 Czech Rep, 2 Canadian, 1 Fijian captains.
Provided 15 British Lions.
Introduced 7s to Wales and won Snellings 10 times and R/U 9 times.
One of pioneers of floodlights in Wales.
Introduced squad systems / players playing on rota in Wales.
Won Welsh Cup twice, R/U 3 times.
Welsh Premier League winners and R/U – twice.

In 1963 Newport, captained by Brian Price, claimed perhaps their greatest victory by defeating New Zealand led by Wilson Whineray 3–0. This turned out to be the All Blacks' only defeat on their 1963 tour. The club was granted Freedom of the City of Newport on the 50th anniversary of this victory.

After rugby turned professional in 1995, Newport initially struggled, being relegated after finishing bottom of the eight-team Welsh Premier Division in 1998, only to be reinstated after Cardiff and Swansea 1998–99 Welsh rugby union rebel season over a dispute with the WRU. After staying up, Newport then moved to full-time professionalism for the 1999-2000 season with the help of benefactor Tony Brown, who financed marquee signings including former South Africa captain Gary Teichmann. The first game of the season against Cardiff drew a crowd of almost 7,000, the biggest since the visit of the All Blacks in 1989. This was accompanied by a rise in season ticket sales from 700 the previous season to 3,300, with a further increase to 4,000 expected the following year.

In 2003, Newport merged with Ebbw Vale to form the Gwent Dragons side (soon renamed Newport Gwent Dragons) as part of the Introduction of regional rugby union teams in Wales. Newport RFC continued to compete as an amateur side in the Welsh club league.

2003–Present
Newport finished the 2021–22 Indigo Group Premiership in second place, having sat the top of table of most of the season. They did, however, win the Premiership Cup with a 25–21 victory over Aberavon at the Millennium Stadium.

Club honours
 South Wales Cup 1878, 1879, 1882, 1883, 1884, 1890.
 Snelling Sevens 1954, 1956, 1957, 1959, 1961, 1962, 1963, 1965, 1967, 1985.
 Welsh Cup 1977, 2001.
 Welsh Premiership Cup 2022. 
 Welsh Division One Winners 1990–91
 Welsh Premier League Winners 2003–04

British and Irish Lions
The following former players were selected for the British and Irish Lions touring squads whilst playing for Newport RFC. Newport hold the record for the number of players from one club selected for a British Lions Tour with eight Newport players being selected for the 1910 British Lions tour to South Africa.

Wales International Captains

The following former players captained the Wales national rugby union team whilst playing for Newport RFC.

Other notable former players

Current squad

Newport RFC Squad 2022/23

Games played against international opposition

See also
 Newport Gwent Dragons
 Newport Saracens RFC
 Newport HSOB RFC
 Pill Harriers RFC
 Bettws RFC

Bibliography

References

External links
Official Website
Newport RFC Supporters Club
Newport Rugby Trust
History of Newport RFC

External links
 Official website

 
Welsh rugby union teams
Rugby clubs established in 1874
History of Newport, Wales
1874 establishments in the United Kingdom
Organisations based in Newport, Wales